was an idea for a railroad linking Japan with the Asian mainland and Europe, formulated in 1938 during the Second Sino-Japanese War leading to World War II. Part of the plan included a tunnel or bridge somewhat similar to the more recent Japan–Korea Undersea Tunnel proposal.

Studied routes 
A report published in 1942 titled  (About the Greater East Asia Through Railway) presents the following routes as proposals:

 , Connecting Tokyo and Syonan-to
TokyoShimonosekiPusanFengtian (present day Shenyang)TientsinPekingHankouHengyangKweilinLiuzhouNanningTrấn Nam QuanXóm CụcThakhekKumphawapiBangkokPadang BesarSyonan-to (present day Singapore)
A separate line to 1. that splits from Tientsin for Nanking
Sea route linking Nagasaki to Shanghai that merges to 1.
 , Branch line of Daiichi through railway
BangkokBan PongThanbyuzayatRangoon (present day Yangon)KyanginChittagong (Partially completed as the military use Thai-Burma Railway)
ChangshaChangdeKunmingLashioMandalayChittagong
 , Connection between Japan and its ally Germany
TokyoShimonosekiPusanFengtianHarbinManzhouliIrkutskMoscowBerlin（utilizes the Siberian Railway）
Tokyo(Kobe or Moji)TientsinZhangjiakouBaotouSuzhouAnxiHamiKashgarKabulBaghdadIstanbulBerlin (Trans-Central Asia Railway Project)
Tokyo(Nagasaki)ShanghaiKunmingRangoonCalcutta (present day Kolkata)PeshawarKabulBaghdadIstanbulBerlin

See also 
 South Manchuria Railway
 Trans-Asian Railway
 Greater East Asia Co-Prosperity Sphere

References 

 
 

Empire of Japan
Proposed undersea tunnels in Asia
Proposed transport infrastructure in Asia